Pasang Lhamu Sherpa (Sherpa: , ; 10 December 1961 – 22 April 1993) was the first Nepalese woman to climb the summit of Mount Everest.

She was born in a mountaineering family and was involved in climbing from her teens.
She had successfully climbed Mount Blanc, Mount Cho Oyu, Mount Yalapic, Pisang Himal, and others. She had attempted to climb Mount Everest three times before, but did not succeed until April 22, 1993, when she reached the summit by the South Col via the Southeast Ridge route.

The morning of April 22, 1993 was bright and clear, and remained so until Pasang reached the top of the 8,848 m. peak with five Sherpas, Sonam Tshering Sherpa, Lhakpa Norbu Sherpa, Pemba Dorje Sherpa and Dawa Tashi Sherpa. Meanwhile, a member of the team and five-time Everest summitter Sonam Tshering Sherpa got seriously sick at south summit and, despite Pasang Lhamu's efforts to help, did not survive his illness. While descending from the summit, the weather, as often happens in the mountains, suddenly turned bad, causing her to lose her own life on the south summit. Vladas Vitkauskas helped move her body down the mountain.

For achieving what no other Nepalese woman had achieved before her, Pasang Lhamu was posthumously honored by her country and mountaineers all around the world in various ways. She was the very first woman to be decorated with the "Nepal Tara (Star)" by the King of Nepal. The National Youth Foundation conferred the 1993-94 Youth Excellence Award on her. Similarly, in order to commemorate her feat, a life-size statue of Pasang Lhamu was erected at Bouddha, Chuchepati; a postage stamp was issued in her name; the Government of Nepal renamed Jasamba Himal (7,315 m) in the Mahalangur Range as Pasang Lhamu Peak; the Ministry of Agriculture named a special strain of wheat as Pasang Lhamu wheat; the Pasang Lhamu Memorial Hall was established in Dhulabari of Jhapa district in east Nepal; and the 117 km Trishuli-Dunche road was named the Pasang Lhamu Highway.'''

See also 
 List of climbers
 List of Mount Everest records
 List of 20th-century summiters of Mount Everest
 Shriya Shah-Klorfine (A Nepali-born Woman who also died on descent, in 2012)
 Lhakpa Sherpa (Nepali born woman with 10 Everest summits)

References

External links
 Pasang Lhamu Sherpa
 Pasang Lhamu Foundation
 Short biography with photo
 The postage stamp
 Pasang: In the Shadow of Everest Movie

1961 births
1993 deaths
People from Solukhumbu District
Nepalese mountain climbers
Sherpa summiters of Mount Everest
Mountaineering deaths on Mount Everest
Recipients of the Order of the Star of Nepal
Nepalese Buddhists
National heroes of Nepal
Nepalese female mountain climbers